The 2011 Swiss Open Grand Prix Gold was a badminton tournament which took place at the St. Jakobshalle in Basel, Switzerland on 15–20 March 2011 and had a total purse of $125,000. This is the 49th edition of the Swiss Open tournament, rated as a Grand Prix Gold event, where before in 2007–2010 was part of the highest grade tournament BWF Superseries.

Men's singles

Seeds

 Jan Ø. Jørgensen (quarterfinals)
 Simon Santoso (semifinals)
 Rajiv Ouseph (withdrew)
 Park Sung-hwan (champion)
 Son Wan-ho (third round)
 Parupalli Kashyap (first round)
 Dionysius Hayom Rumbaka (withdrew)
 Dicky Palyama (third round)
 Muhammad Hafiz Hashim (third round)
 Kazushi Yamada (third round)
 Joachim Persson (second round)
 Wong Choong Hann (semifinals)
 Sho Sasaki (quarterfinals)
 Przemyslaw Wacha (withdrew)
 Brice Leverdez (withdrew)
 Hans-Kristian Vittinghus (third round)

Finals

Top half

Section 1

Section 2

Section 3

Section 4

Bottom half

Section 1

Section 2

Section 3

Section 4

Women's singles

Seeds

 Tine Baun (withdrew)
 Saina Nehwal (champion)
 Juliane Schenk (semifinals)
 Bae Youn-joo (semifinals)
 Ella Diehl (first round)
 Petya Nedelcheva (quarterfinals)
 Yao Jie (second round)
 Cheng Shao-chieh (first round)

Finals

Top half

Section 1

Section 2

Bottom half

Section 3

Section 4

Men's doubles

Seeds

  Mathias Boe / Carsten Mogensen (second round)
  Ko Sung-hyun / Yoo Yeon-seong (champion)
  Jung Jae-sung / Lee Yong-dae (final)
  Fang Chieh-min / Lee Sheng-mu (semifinals)
  Mohammad Ahsan / Bona Septano (quarterfinals)
  Mads Conrad-Petersen / Jonas Rasmussen (second round)
  Alvent Yulianto Chandra / Hendra Aprida Gunawan (semifinals)
  Ingo Kindervater / Johannes Schöttler (quarterfinals)

Finals

Top half

Section 1

Section 2

Bottom half

Section 3

Section 4
{{8TeamBracket-Tennis3
| RD1=First Round
| RD2=Second Round
| RD3=Quarterfinals
| team-width=160

| RD1-seed1= 
| RD1-team1= Yoshiteru Hirobe Kenta Kazuno
| RD1-score1-1=21'''
| RD1-score1-2=23| RD1-score1-3=
| RD1-seed2= 
| RD1-team2= Liao Min-chun Wu Chun-wei
| RD1-score2-1='15
| RD1-score2-2=21
| RD1-score2-3=

| RD1-seed3= 
| RD1-team3= Adam Cwalina Michal Logosz
| RD1-score3-1=19
| RD1-score3-2=10
| RD1-score3-3=
| RD1-seed4=5
| RD1-team4= Mohammad Ahsan Bona Septano| RD1-score4-1=21| RD1-score4-2=21| RD1-score4-3=

| RD1-seed5= 
| RD1-team5= Kwon Yi-goo Shin Baek-cheol
| RD1-score5-1=21| RD1-score5-2=5r
| RD1-score5-3=
| RD1-seed6= 
| RD1-team6= Naoki Kawamae Shoji Sato| RD1-score6-1=16
| RD1-score6-2=6
| RD1-score6-3=

| RD1-seed7=Q
| RD1-team7= Kim Gi-jung   Kim Sa-rang
| RD1-score7-1=12
| RD1-score7-2=18
| RD1-score7-3=
| RD1-seed8=2
| RD1-team8= Ko Sung-hyun Yoo Yeon-seong| RD1-score8-1=21| RD1-score8-2=21| RD1-score8-3=

| RD2-seed1= 
| RD2-team1= Yoshiteru Hirobe Kenta Kazuno
| RD2-score1-1=22| RD2-score1-2=16
| RD2-score1-3=14
| RD2-seed2=5
| RD2-team2= Mohammad Ahsan Bona Septano| RD2-score2-1=20
| RD2-score2-2=21| RD2-score2-3=21| RD2-seed3= 
| RD2-team3= Naoki Kawamae Shoji Sato
| RD2-score3-1=21| RD2-score3-2=14
| RD2-score3-3=19
| RD2-seed4=2
| RD2-team4= Ko Sung-hyun Yoo Yeon-seong| RD2-score4-1=19
| RD2-score4-2=21| RD2-score4-3=21| RD3-seed1=5
| RD3-team1= Mohammad Ahsan Bona Septano
| RD3-score1-1=13
| RD3-score1-2=18
| RD3-score1-3=
| RD3-seed2=2
| RD3-team2= Ko Sung-hyun Yoo Yeon-seong| RD3-score2-1=21| RD3-score2-2=21| RD3-score2-3=
}}

Women's doubles
Seeds

  Cheng Wen-hsing / Chien Yu-chin (quarterfinals)
  Meiliana Jauhari / Greysia Polii (semifinals)
  Shinta Mulia Sari / Yao Lei (second round)
  Lotte Jonathans / Paulien van Dooremalen (first round)
  Christinna Pedersen / Kamilla Rytter Juhl (semifinals)
  Sandra Marinello / Birgit Michels (second round)
  Shizuka Matsuo / Mami Naito (quarterfinals)
  Rie Eto / Yu Wakita (second round)

Finals

Top half
Section 1

Section 2

Bottom half
Section 3

Section 4

Mixed doubles
Seeds

  Chen Hung-ling / Cheng Wen-hsing (quarterfinals)
  Nathan Robertson / Jenny Wallwork (final)
  Lee Sheng-mu / Chien Yu-chin (first round)
  Joachim Fischer Nielsen / Christinna Pedersen (champion)'  Tontowi Ahmad / Liliyana Natsir (semifinals)  Michael Fuchs / Birgit Michels (second round)  Fran Kurniawan / Pia Zebadiah Bernadeth (first round)  Lee Yong-dae / Ha Jung-eun (semifinals)''

Finals

Top half

Section 1

Section 2

Bottom half

Section 3

Section 4

References

External links
 Tournament Link

Swiss Open (badminton)
Swiss Open Grand Prix Gold
Sports competitions in Basel